Pietracatella is a comune (municipality) in the Province of Campobasso in the Italian region Molise, located about  east of Campobasso.

Pietracatella borders the following municipalities: Gambatesa, Jelsi, Macchia Valfortore, Monacilioni, Riccia, Toro.

References

Cities and towns in Molise